The 2022 Milwaukee mayoral special election was held on April 5, 2022, to elect the mayor of Milwaukee, Wisconsin. While the next regularly-scheduled date for a Milwaukee mayoral election is in 2024, incumbent mayor Tom Barrett resigned to serve as U.S. Ambassador to Luxembourg. The special election was the first open race for mayor of the city since 2004.

Municipal elections in Wisconsin are nonpartisan. A nonpartisan primary election, which was held on February 15, determined which two candidates were listed on the general election ballot. Acting mayor Cavalier Johnson and alderman Bob Donovan advanced to the general election. Johnson handily defeated Donovan in the general election, becoming the first African American elected mayor of Milwaukee.

Candidates

Advanced to general
Bob Donovan, Milwaukee alderman and candidate for mayor in 2016
Cavalier Johnson, Milwaukee Common Council president and acting mayor

Eliminated in primary
Sheila Conley-Patterson
Marina Dimitrijevic, Milwaukee alderwoman and former chairwoman of the Milwaukee County Board of Supervisors
Earnell Lucas, Milwaukee County sheriff
Nick McVey
Michael Sampson
Lena Taylor, Wisconsin state senator, former Wisconsin state assemblywoman, and candidate for mayor in 2020

Withdrew
 Daniel Riemer, Wisconsin state assemblyman

Declined
Chris Abele, former Milwaukee County Executive
Mandela Barnes, Lieutenant Governor of Wisconsin and former Wisconsin state assemblyman (running for U.S. Senate)
David Bowen, Wisconsin state assemblyman
David Clarke, former Milwaukee County sheriff
Evan Goyke, Wisconsin state assemblyman
Chris Larson, former minority leader of the Wisconsin Senate
Chantia Lewis, Milwaukee alderman
Michael Murphy, Milwaukee alderman
Tearman Spencer, Milwaukee city attorney

Endorsements

Primary election

Polling

Results

General election

Results

Notes

Partisan clients

References

Milwaukee mayoral special
Milwaukee special
2022
Milwaukee mayoral special